Statistics of the Scottish Football League in season 1905–06.

Scottish League Division One

Scottish League Division Two

See also
1905–06 in Scottish football

References

 
1905-06